Cnemaspis palakkadensis is a species of diurnal gecko endemic to India.

References

 http://reptile-database.reptarium.cz/species?genus=Cnemaspis&species=palakkadensis
 https://www.inaturalist.org/taxa/Cnemaspis_palakkadensis

Reptiles of India
Reptiles described in 2020
pava
Endemic fauna of India